Mechanicstown is an unincorporated community in Jefferson County, West Virginia, United States. Mechanicstown lies on West Virginia Route 115 (Charles Town Road) at its intersection with County Route 25 (Kabletown Road) and County Route 9/3 (Cattail Run Road).

References

Unincorporated communities in Jefferson County, West Virginia
Unincorporated communities in West Virginia